Miss Madame (German: Fräulein Frau) is a 1923 Austrian silent film directed by Hans Theyer and starring Renati Renee, Albert von Kersten and Ica von Lenkeffy.

Cast
 Renati Renee
 Albert von Kersten
 Ica von Lenkeffy
 Hugo Werner-Kahle

References

Bibliography
 Jan Distelmeyer. Alliierte für den Film: Arnold Pressburger, Gregor Rabinowitsch und die Cine-Allianz. 2004.

External links

1923 films
Austrian silent feature films
Films directed by Hans Theyer
Austrian black-and-white films